Marcos Daniel Montiel González (born 12 July 1995) is a Uruguayan footballer who plays as a defender for Nacional in the Uruguayan Primera División.

Career
In January 2023, Montiel joined Nacional, signing alongside Daniel Bocanegra and Fabián Noguera.

References

External links
Profile at Football Database

1995 births
Living people
Villa Teresa players
Club Atlético River Plate (Montevideo) players
Club Nacional de Football players
Uruguayan Primera División players
Uruguayan Segunda División players
Uruguayan footballers
Association football defenders
Footballers from Montevideo